The 1974 World Junior Ice Hockey Championships were held in Leningrad, Soviet Union between December 27, 1973, and January 6, 1974.  The host Soviet team won the tournament with a perfect 5–0 record.
This was the first edition of the Ice Hockey World Junior Championship, but the results are not included in official IIHF records.
Canada was represented by a club team, the Peterborough Petes, while the other five nations were represented by teams of their top under-20 players.

Final standings
The tournament was a round-robin format, with each team playing each of the other five teams once each.

Results

Scoring leaders

Tournament awards

References

 "Matches internationaux des moins de 20 ans 1973/74". Retrieved 2011-10-08.

World Junior Ice Hockey Championships
Junior, World 1974
World Junior Ice Hockey Championships
International ice hockey competitions hosted by the Soviet Union
December 1973 sports events in Europe
January 1974 sports events in Europe
Sports competitions in Saint Petersburg
1970s in Leningrad